Hengen pitimet (translation: Spirit holders) is the tenth studio album by the Finnish thrash metal band Mokoma. The album was released through Sakara Records on May 25, 2018, and was produced by Janne Saksa. The album peaked on the top position of the Official Finnish Charts.

Track listing

Personnel
 Kuisma Aalto – guitar, backing vocals
 Marko Annala – vocals
 Janne Hyrkäs – drums
 Santtu Hämäläinen – bass
 Tuomo Saikkonen – guitar

References 

2018 albums
Mokoma albums